Jean Duhau (1906-1973) is a French rugby footballer who represented France as a player in both rugby league and rugby union. He later became a coach and coached France rugby league team in multiple Rugby League World Cups.

Playing career
Duhau originally played rugby union and played in the 1926–27 French Rugby Union Championship for Stade Français. He made his debut for France on 28 January 1928, becoming French representative 235. He later switched to rugby league, being part of the France side that toured Great Britain in 1934.

Coaching career
Duhau later became a coach and coached the France rugby league team during their 1951 tour of Australia and New Zealand and at the inaugural 1954 Rugby League World Cup. He also later coached the team at the 1957 and 1960 Rugby League World Cups.

References

1906 births
1973 deaths
Dual-code rugby internationals
France international rugby union players
France national rugby league team coaches
France national rugby league team players
French rugby league coaches
French rugby league players
French rugby union players
RC Roanne XIII players
Rugby league props
Rugby league second-rows
Rugby union props
Stade Français players